Pirena is a genus of gastropods belonging to the family Pachychilidae.

The species of this genus are found in Malesia and Africa.

Species:

Pirena bicarinata 
Pirena johnsoni 
Pirena madagascariensis 
Pirena sinuosa 
Pirena vazimba 
Pirena vivipara 
Pirena zazavavindrano

References

Gastropods